Phygopoda jacobi is a species of beetle in the family Cerambycidae. It was described by Ernst Fuchs in 1961.

References

Rhinotragini
Beetles described in 1961